The year 1740 in architecture involved some significant events.

Events
 In Ballymena (Ireland), the original Ballymena Castle burns down.

Buildings and structures

Buildings

 Teatro Regio (Turin) opened.
 Teatro di Santa Maria, Florence built.
 Falkenlust Palace, Brühl, Germany, completed.
 Château d'Hérouville, France, designed by Gaudot, built.
 Duff House in Banff, Scotland, designed by William Adam, is completed.
 In Boston, Massachusetts, Faneuil Hall, the covered market, is built by Huguenot merchant Pierre Faneuil.
 Old Library, Bristol, probably designed by James Paty the Elder, built.
 Örskär lighthouse, Sweden, rebuilt in stone to the design of Carl Hårleman.
 South Wing of St Bartholomew's Hospital, London, designed by James Gibbs, built.
 Saint Sampson's Cathedral, Saint Petersburg, designed by Pietro Antonio Trezzini, consecrated
 Old First Presbyterian Church (Wilmington, Delaware) built.
 Chaurasi Khambon ki Chhatri, Bundi, Rajasthan, built.
 In Philadelphia, the house which will become known as Betsy Ross House is built.
 Church of Santa María de Loreto, Achao on the Chiloé Archipelago completed by about this date.

Births
 Thomas Cooley, English-born architect working in Ireland (died 1784)

Deaths
Antonio Montauti, Italian sculptor, medallist and possible architect (born 1685)
Approximate date – John Strahan, English architect

References

Architecture
Years in architecture
18th-century architecture